The 2012 ICC World Cricket League Division Four was a cricket tournament which took place from 3 to 10 September 2012. It formed part of the ICC World Cricket League and qualifying for the 2015 World Cup.

The host country for the tournament was Malaysia.

Teams
The teams that took part in the tournament were decided according to the results of the 2010 ICC World Cricket League Division Four, the 2011 ICC World Cricket League Division Three and the 2012 ICC World Cricket League Division Five.

Squads

Fixtures

Group stage

Points table

Matches

Playoffs

5th place playoff

3rd place playoff

Final

Statistics

Most Runs
The top five run scorers (total runs) are included in this table.

Most Wickets
The top five wicket takers (total wickets) are listed in this table.

Final placings

After the conclusion of the tournament the teams were distributed as follows:

References

2012 Division Four